The 1907 Southern Intercollegiate Athletic Association football season was the college football games played by the member schools of the Southern Intercollegiate Athletic Association as part of the 1907 college football season. The season began on September 28 with conference member Clemson hosting Gordon.

Vanderbilt gave a shock to the football world by tying  Eastern power Navy 6–6. The Commodores also beat Georgia Tech by the largest margin in coach John Heisman's tenure, and beat a powerful Sewanee team on a double pass play which Grantland Rice called the greatest thrill in his years of watching sports. Innis Brown later wrote "Sewanee in all probability had the best team in the South." Dan McGugin in Spalding's Football Guide's summation of the season in the SIAA wrote "The standing. First, Vanderbilt; second, Sewanee, a might good second;" and that Aubrey Lanier "came near winning the Vanderbilt game by his brilliant dashes after receiving punts." The only loss suffered all season for Vanderbilt was to Western power Michigan.

LSU played the University of Havana in Cuba, the first time any Southern team played in a foreign country.

Results and team statistics

Key

PPG = Average of points scored per game
PAG = Average of points allowed per game

Regular season

SIAA teams in bold.

Week One

Week Two

Week Three

Week Four

Week Five

Week Six

Week Seven

Week Eight

Week Nine

Week Ten

Bowl games

Awards and honors

All-Americans

E - Bob Blake, Vanderbilt (FY-1, AFR)
C - Stein Stone, Vanderbilt (AFR)

All-Southern team

The consensus All-Southern team:

Notes

References